Paola Giometti is a Brazilian young adult and fantasy author known for O Destino do Lobo (The Destiny of the Wolves) novel. In 1994, she was considered the youngest writer in Brazil with the release of the book Noite ao Amanhecer, published by Cassandra Rios.

Biography
Giometti was born in the city of São Paulo, Brazil, in 1983. She studied Biology at Methodist University of São Paulo. In 2013, she gained a Master’s degree in Pharmacology from Federal University of São Paulo, and a PhD in Natural Sciences. 

In 1994, at age 11, she published Noite ao Amanhecer (Night At Dawn). 

She is the author of three books and has organized and worked collaboratively on several collections of short stories. The Destiny of the Wolves is her second solo book and was released by Giz Editorial in 2014. Together with O Código das Águias (The Code of the Eagles) and O Chamado dos bisões (The Call of the Bison), it makes up the Fábulas da Terra (Tales of the Earth) series, which was published by Elo Editorial in 2020. In this series, she combines both her academic and real-life experiences to portray nature as accurately as possible.

In 2018, Lendari publisher, Giometti published the book Drako e a Elite dos Dragões Dourados (Drako and the Golden Dragon´s Elite), which talks about the friendship between a dragon and a fly that teaches young people to overcome pessimism and problems with self-esteem. It further considers and normalizes differences.

In July 2020, Giometti released her sixth book, Symbiosa e a Ameaça no Ártico (Symbiosa and the Threat in the Arctic), by Elo Editorial. She was nominated for the International Recognition Award for Brazilian Literature 2020, held by Focus Brasil NY, which will be delivered during the World Meeting of Brazilian Literature, between 9 and 12 September 2020. Her first book published in English is The Destiny of the Wolves, being the first in the Tales of the Earth series.

Giometti was honored by the Brazilian embassy in Oslo in 2018 for her work in youth literature. The author lives in Tromsø, Norway.

References 

1983 births
Living people
Brazilian women novelists
20th-century Brazilian novelists
20th-century Brazilian women writers
21st-century Brazilian novelists
21st-century Brazilian women writers
Writers from São Paulo
Methodist University of São Paulo alumni
Federal University of São Paulo alumni
Women writers of young adult literature
Brazilian writers of young adult literature